Rafael Aníbal Infantino Abreu (born August 28, 1984 in La Vega Province) is a Dominican-born Colombian former professional cyclist.

Major results

2002
 5th Time trial, UCI Junior Road World Championships
2004
 1st  Time trial, Pan American Under-23 Road Championships
 2nd Overall Vuelta a Colombia U23
 3rd Vuelta a la Independencia Nacional
2007
 1st Trofeo Matteotti U23
 6th Overall Giro della Valle d'Aosta
1st Stages 4 & 5
 8th Overall Giro del Friuli-Venezia Giulia
1st Mountains classification
1st Stage 5
2009
 Clásico RCN
1st Stages 1 (TTT) & 7
 Bolivarian Games
2nd  Time trial
3rd  Road race
2010
 2nd Time trial, National Road Championships
2011
 1st Overall Clásico RCN
1st Stages 7, 8 & 9
 1st Stage 6a Vuelta a la Independencia Nacional
 6th Overall USA Pro Cycling Challenge
 10th Overall Tour do Rio
2012
 3rd Overall Clásico RCN
2013
 Vuelta a Colombia
1st Stages 3, 8 & 14 (ITT)
2015
 Vuelta a Colombia
1st Stages 1 (TTT) & 8 (ITT)
 2nd Time trial, National Road Championships

References

External links

1984 births
Living people
Colombian male cyclists
Colombian people of Dominican Republic descent